CD Radio 1, also known as Radiosat 1, was an American communications satellite which was operated by Sirius XM Radio, previously Sirius Satellite Radio. It was constructed by Space Systems Loral and was based on the LS-1300 satellite bus. Launch occurred on 30 June 2000, at 22:08 GMT. The launch was contracted by International Launch Services, and used a LV Proton K  rocket flying from military pad Site 81/24 at the military polygon Baikonur Cosmodrome.

It was operating in a HEO, from where it provided satellite radio communications services to all Earth (global). It had an expected planned money lifetime of 15 years.

In 2016, the satellite was decommissioned and placed into a disposal orbit.

See also

Sirius FM-2
Sirius FM-3
Sirius FM-5

References 

Communications satellites in geosynchronous orbit
Spacecraft launched in 2000
Satellites using the SSL 1300 bus
Sirius XM